Plymouth Pavilions is an entertainment and sports complex in Plymouth, Devon, England. It has an ice rink and indoor arena. The arena is used as an entertainment venue and also for corporate hire.

The Pavilions is built on the site of the former Millbay railway station that is directly opposite the Duke of Cornwall Hotel. The granite pillars which can be seen outside the main entrance were once the gate posts to the station.

Ice rink and pool closure
Plymouth Pavilions is one of the only indoor centres with an ice rink in Devon.

Plymouth Pavilions was also the home of a family fun indoor swimming pool - including an underwater-themed extension which closed in 2003; however on 18 March 2012, in response to the opening of the state-of-the-art Plymouth Life Centre, the swimming pool was shut down. The area once used by the pool has been vacated and abandoned, as of 2018.

The Arena, Shows and concerts
The Plymouth Pavilions Arena has a standing capacity of 4,000 and a seated capacity of 2,500. The Arena frequently hosts and promotes large scale concerts, previous artists to have played at The Pavilions include: Kanye West, Ed Sheeran, Little Mix and Pink. The fastest selling show at Pavilions, was the Arctic Monkeys, selling out in one hour in 2006.
In 2012 that record was matched by Gary Barlow, selling out in just under one hour.

The Plymouth Pavilions has its own box office and ticketing platform for Ticketing purchases, this is called The Ticket Store.
As of 2018 Plymouth Pavilions launched 'Pavilions Introduces', an intimate academy sized gig night for established and upcoming south west talent. The first night featured the South Wests Land of the Giants with support from London-based band Tankus The Henge.

Sport

Basketball

The arena was home to the Plymouth Raiders professional basketball team, who competed in the elite British Basketball League. The Raiders had one of the biggest fan bases in British basketball, and games were often played in front of sell-out crowds of up to 1,480 people. The arena had been home to the Raiders since 1996, when the team moved in from the nearby Mayflower Centre looking for a bigger venue to play at.

On 8 July 2021, Plymouth Raiders withdrew from the British Basketball League for the 2021-22 season due to an increase in the cost of renting the Plymouth Pavilions. Later in the month, it was announced by the BBL that the city of Plymouth would have a franchise in the league for the 2021–22 season, led by local businessman Carl Heslop.

On 9 August 2021, Plymouth announced that the new franchise will be called the Plymouth City Patriots for the 2021–22 season. The naming and branding rights of the Plymouth Raiders were retained by the previous owners because the Patriots couldn't afford the naming rights of 'Plymouth Raiders 1983 Ltd'. The Patriots will play their home games at Plymouth Pavilions for only one season due to high rental costs.

The venue is one of the most unusual looking basketball arenas in the country, with one large two-tiered stand and a smaller temporary stand situated on the events stage. It is known for its off-court entertainment including spectacular in-house sound & light shows with pyrotechnics.

Premier League Darts
From 2005 to 2008, the arena was part of the Premier League Darts event for the PDC.

Other sporting events
On 1 April 2016, it was announced by WWE that the arena would host a date for the upcoming NXT UK tour in June, which was later followed up by UK company 5 Star Wrestling hosting an event in the Pavilions. The WWE announced in 2018 that they would be returning to the Pavilions for an NXT UK TV taping taking place in October 2018.

References

External links
Plymouth Pavilions

Basketball venues in England
Sports venues in Plymouth, Devon
Indoor arenas in England
Plymouth City Patriots
Plymouth Raiders
Darts venues